Yoldash (lit. Comrade) is the main Kumyk language newspaper in Dagestan, Russia. It is the successor of the Soviet era Lenin yolu (Ленин ёлу, Lenin's Path). 
 Newspapers published in the Soviet Union
Kumyk language
Makhachkala
Newspapers of Dagestan